{{Infobox television
| image                    = BBC London and South East.jpg
| image_size               = 
| caption                  = 
| picture_format           = 
| runtime                  = 15 minutes
| channel                  = BBC One LondonBBC One South East
| first_aired              = 
| last_aired               = present
| producer                 = BBC South East
| related                  = BBC South East TodayBBC London NewsITV News MeridianITV News London| location                 = Great Hall Studios, Royal Tunbridge Wells
}}BBC London and South East was a pan-regional weekday lunchtime television news bulletin which was broadcast on BBC One in the London and South East regions between March and September 2020. The programme was produced and broadcast live from the BBC's South East Regional Production Centre in Royal Tunbridge Wells. All other local news bulletins remained separate for the two regions.

The decision to merge the two programmes was due to the ongoing COVID-19 pandemic in the United Kingdom and to allow fewer studios to be needed for broadcasting.

The lunchtime bulletin was first broadcast on 25 March 2020. Combined breakfast bulletins had been broadcast during BBC Breakfast beforehand but these were dropped following the decision to temporarily remove local news bulletins during Breakfast due to the COVID-19 pandemic.

The final regular edition was broadcast on 4 September 2020. After this date the lunchtime bulletins returned to BBC London News and South East Today.

On 23 January 2021, the edition briefly returned for a week due to staff shortages at BBC London.

On 17 July 2021, the edition returned once again, and later returned once more on 20 December 2021.

See also
 BBC London News South East Today Newsroom South East''

References

External links
 

BBC Regional News shows
Mass media in Kent
Mass media in Sussex
Mass media in Surrey
Mass media in London
2020 British television series debuts
Television news in England
BBC London and South East